Jared Breeze (born 2005) is an American child actor.  He starred in the title role of the 2015 film, The Boy.

Career 
Breeze's first film appearance was in 2014, in Cooties, and his performance brought him to the attention of the producers of The Boy (2015).  Breeze was one of the first children to audition for the title role. Craig William Macneill, the director, cited Breeze's "quiet curiosity" as to why he was cast. His performance was well received.

Breeze has also appeared in TV shows, including We Are Men (2013), Your Family or Mine (2015) and Another Period (2018), and he played Max Rayburn in the TV soap opera, The Young and the Restless (2016).

Partial filmography

References

External links 
 

Living people
People from California
21st-century American male actors
American male child actors
2005 births